Laguna Santiago Educational Foundation is a college school located in Santa Cruz, Laguna, Philippines. It is recognized as a private Higher Education Institution by the Commission on Higher Education.

It was established in 1947 and currently led by Architect Ariel Ting.

References

Universities and colleges in Laguna (province)
1947 establishments in the Philippines
Educational institutions established in 1947